Mogaung Township is a township of Mohnyin District in the Kachin State of Burma (Myanmar). The principal town is Mogaung.

References

Townships of Kachin State